The 39th Manitoba Legislature was elected in a general election held May 22, 2007. 

The majority NDP government under the leadership of Premier Gary Doer had been sustained for a third term in office.

On August 27, 2009, Doer announced that he would be stepping down as Premier. Greg Selinger was elected in a leadership convention held on October 17, 2009 and was sworn in as premier two days later.

Hugh McFadyen of the Progressive Conservative Party served as Leader of the Opposition.

George Hickes served as speaker for the assembly.

There were five sessions of the 39th Legislature:

The legislature was dissolved on September 6, 2011.

John Harvard was Lieutenant Governor of Manitoba until August 3, 2009, when Philip S. Lee became lieutenant governor.

Members of the 39th Legislative Assembly

Source:

Standings changes since the 2007 general election

Sources:

References

Terms of the Manitoba Legislature
2007 establishments in Manitoba
2011 disestablishments in Manitoba